Maurice Tremblay (23 April 1944 – 20 February 2022) was a Progressive Conservative member of the House of Commons of Canada. Born in Jonquière, Quebec, he was a lawyer by career.

He represented the Quebec riding of Lotbinière where he was first elected in the 1984 federal election and re-elected in 1988, therefore becoming a member in the 33rd and 34th Canadian Parliaments.

Tremblay left federal politics in 1993 as he did not seek a third term in Parliament.

References

External links
 

1944 births
2022 deaths
French Quebecers
Lawyers in Quebec
Members of the House of Commons of Canada from Quebec
Politicians from Saguenay, Quebec
Progressive Conservative Party of Canada MPs